Henri Peuchot (29 April 1889 – 29 March 1978) was a French field hockey player. He competed in the men's tournament at the 1928 Summer Olympics.

References

External links
 

1889 births
1978 deaths
French male field hockey players
Olympic field hockey players of France
Field hockey players at the 1928 Summer Olympics